Adam Hills Tonight, formerly known as Adam Hills in Gordon Street Tonight, is a comedic Australian television interview show that ran from February 2011 to July 2013 on ABC1. It was hosted by comedian Adam Hills and co-starred Hannah Gadsby and Dave O'Neil. The show featured celebrity guests, comedy, and live music.

History and production

The first series went to air as Adam Hills in Gordon Street Tonight from 9 February 2011.
The series was co-written by Hills, Gadsby, Michael Chamberlin, Stephen Hall, Justin Kennedy and others.

The program was filmed at ABC TV's Melbourne studios in Gordon Street, Elsternwick and involved significant audience participation based on a questionnaire that audience members filled in prior to the show, focusing on unusual traits, habits or belongings of audience members. These have included membership in "The Church of the Latter Day Geek" and "Mousey", the bedtime companion of an adult audience member. Popular audience members were invited to return; for example Mousey's adventures became an ongoing theme in the first series, culminating in a hit single about the toy released on iTunes by Hills.

The second series premiered on 8 February 2012.

The title of the show in the third series, which ran from 15 May 2013, was changed to Adam Hills Tonight, with the Gordon St set being removed from the studio. The removal of the Gordon St theme was only explained satirically during an ABC advertisement for the show, in which Adam Hills was told that the set was too high and was removed, instead of simply making it lower.

On 28 November 2013, Adam Hills announced that the show was ending as he feared "running out of funny" and that trying to combine careers in Australia and the UK at the same time was proving to be impractical.

Episodes

See also 
 List of Australian television series

References

External links 

 

 
Australian television talk shows
Australian Broadcasting Corporation original programming
2011 Australian television series debuts
Television shows set in Melbourne
English-language television shows